The Grand River Conference, is a high school athletic conference comprising small-size high schools located in northwest Missouri. The conference members are located in Andrew, Buchanan, Caldwell, Daviess, DeKalb, Gentry, Grundy, Harrison, Mercer, Putnam, and Worth counties.

History
Founded in December 1929, the conference was formed with six schools: King City, Stanberry, Maysville, Bethany, Albany and Grant City as the Grand River Six.  By 1936, the conference had grown to eight teams.  Various schools joined and dropped over the years, with several schools switching to 8-player football a contributing factor.  By 2011, the conference had ten members, and by 2016, the conference was at 16 teams.

Members
As of 2021, the Grand River Conference consists of sixteen high schools, split into two divisions.

East Division

West Division

References

Missouri high school athletic conferences
High school sports conferences and leagues in the United States